Onegin most often refers to Alexander Pushkin's 1833 verse novel Eugene Onegin. Works based on Pushkin's poem titled "Onegin" include:
 Onegin (film), a 1999 British-American film, derived from the novel
 Onegin (Cranko), a ballet created by John Cranko, derived from the novel

People with the surname
Sigrid Onégin (1889-1943) opera singer

See also
 Eugene Onegin (disambiguation)